The 1933 German football championship, the 26th edition of the competition, ended with the first national title for Fortuna Düsseldorf. The title was won with a 3–0 win over Schalke 04. It was a replay of the Western German championship final, in which Schalke had defeated Fortuna 1–0 on 30 April 1933.

For both clubs it was their first appearance in the German final. While Fortuna only played one more after this, in 1936, for Schalke it was the first in its golden era, playing in every final until 1942, except the 1936 one. Fortuna became the first Champion from the industrial western part of Germany.

The 1933 final was played after the rise of the Nazis to power in Germany. After this season, the German league system was overhauled and instead of the regional championships as qualifying competitions, the 16 Gauligas were introduced.

To qualify for the national championship, a team needed to win or finish runners-up in one of the seven regional championships. On top of those 14 clubs, the two strongest regions, West and South were allowed to send a third team each. In the West, this was the local cup winner while in the South, the third placed team of the championship received this place.

Qualified teams
The teams qualified through the regional football championships:

Competition

Round of 16

Quarter-finals

Semi-finals

Final
The 1933 final saw Schalke as the favorite for the title, having already beaten Fortuna in the Western German championship in late April. In front of 60,000, 20,000 of those Fortuna supporters, the club, who had not conceded a goal in the previous three rounds and scored 16, scored the first goal in the tenth minute. Schalke never got into their rhythm and when Fortuna scored the third goal five minutes from the end, the game was decided.

It was the third time that the final was held in Cologne, after 1912 and 1931 and had the second-best attendance until then, only surpassed by the 1923 final, held in Hamburg in front of 64,000.

Top scorers
The top scorer of the competition:

References

Sources
 Süddeutschlands Fussball in Tabellenform 1897–1988, by Ludolf Hyll, page 98 – German championship 1933
 kicker Allmanach 1990, by kicker, page 164 & 177 – German championship

External links
 German Championship 1932–33 at weltfussball.de 
 German Championship 1933 at RSSSF

 

1
German
German football championship seasons